Hans-Georg Fleck (born July 15, 1953 in Trier) is a German historian and former Country Director at Friedrich-Naumann-Stiftung für die Freiheit (FNF).

Biography 
At the age of five he moved with his parents and his two elder siblings to Neuwied where he lived until he graduated from the Werner-Heisenberg-Gymnasium Neuwied in 1972. His scholarly performance led him to receive a scholarship from the Studienstiftung des Deutschen Volkes to fund his tertiary education. He went on to study at the University of Bonn and the University of Würzburg, receiving a Magister Artium in History, Political Science and Philosophy in 1979. From 1979 to 1982, Fleck worked as a research assistant at the History Department, University of Cologne. From 1985 to 1990, Fleck worked as an academic researcher at the Archive of the Federal Foreign Office in Bonn being a member of the Editorial Group of Akten zur Deutschen Auswärtigen Politik (ADAP). As a staffer of the German Free Democratic Party (FDP), Fleck was tasked in March 1990 to support the preparation of the first democratic Parliamentary Elections in the German Democratic Republic (DDR).
 
In 1991, Fleck became Country Director of the Friedrich Naumann Foundation for Freedom in Warsaw/Poland. Following a 6-year stint in Poland, Fleck moved in 1997 to head the FNF program for the former Yugoslavia based in Zagreb/Croatia. In 2005, he moved to Jerusalem as FNF’s Country Director for Israel and Palestine and in 2012, he relocated to Istanbul as the foundation’s Country Director for Turkey. In his capacity as Country Director, Fleck has engaged with high-ranking politicians, prestigious academic scholars, civil society leaders, and influential businessmen. Fleck has published extensively in German and international periodicals on, i.a., topics of liberalism and democratization. He is a popular political analyst for German media.
 
 
Fleck is married to Annette Lippke; they have three children.

Academic Work 
In his academic publications, Fleck focuses on the theories and the history of Liberalism. He has been particularly interested in the historic development of the concept of ‘social liberalism’, which is rooted in the formation of workers’ education, cooperatives, and trade unions. Fleck has also engaged extensively with the politics of historical narratives and remembrance in Post-World War II Europe trying to understand the drivers and formative elements of newly (re-)constructed national identities.

Literature

Notes and references

External links 
 Statement: Liberalism in 10 Seconds
 Statement: Freedom in 10 Seconds

1953 births
20th-century German historians
Living people
21st-century German historians